Rosamund Kwan Chi Lam (born Kwan Kar Wai on 24 September 1962) is a Hong Kong former actress, best known for starring as the female lead "Thirteenth Aunt" in the 1990s Once Upon a Time in China film series. She had since retired from acting in 2007.

Kwan co-founded the Hong Kong-based beauty brand RK Beauty with fellow actress Helen Ma.

Career 
Kwan was born in British Hong Kong. Her father, Shaw Brothers star Kwan Shan, was from Shenyang, Liaoning, China, and was of Manchu ethnicity. Her mother, Cheung Bing-sai (張冰茜), was from Shanghai and was also an actress. Growing up, Kwan attended Maryknoll Convent School in Kowloon Tong.

Kwan's first acting role was in the ATV soap opera . Her film debut was alongside Chow Yun-fat in the 1982 film, The Head Hunter. She appeared with Jackie Chan, Sammo Hung and Yuen Biao in Twinkle, Twinkle Lucky Stars and again with Chan in Project A Part II and Armour of God. She also appeared with Jet Li in the films Swordsman II, Dr. Wai in "The Scripture with No Words" and as Shao Yun a.k.a. "Sup Sum Yee" ("Shi San Yi" in Mandarin, "13th Aunt" in English) throughout the Once Upon a Time in China film series.

Although the majority of her acting roles were in dramatic films, she is best known internationally for her roles in Hong Kong action films, alongside a variety of major stars of the genre.

Amongst her more dramatic roles, she notably appeared with Andy Lau in several films including Casino Raiders and The Wesley's Mysterious File. Kwan also released a record in 1994, a duet with Lau called "Love Forever".

In 2001 she appeared in Feng Xiaogang's Chinese comedy, Big Shot's Funeral, which starred Donald Sutherland as a film director and Kwan as his assistant. Although her last film role was in 2005, Kwan officially announced her retirement from acting in 2007.

Personal life 
Kwan first married to financial service mogul Chris Wong Kwok Sing in 1981, which lasted only nine months, they split in 1982. Kwan later married Taiwanese businessman Pierre Chen in 2014 without a public announcement, but they divorced in 2015.

Selected filmography 

The Head Hunter a.k.a. Long Goodbye (1982) – Vicky Lee
The Lost Generation (1983) – Shirley
Feng liu zhong (1984)
Prince Charming (1984) – Wan Puipui
Long Road to Gallantry (1984) – Mu Wan Er
Twinkle, Twinkle Lucky Stars (1985) – Wang Yi-Ching
Millionaire's Express (1986) – Chi
Armour of God (1986) – Lorelei
Project A Part II (1987) – Miss Pak
Profiles of Pleasure (1988) – Chin Chin
Three Against The World (1988) – Fan's daughter
Heart to Hearts (1988) – Peggy
Vengeance Is Mine (1988) – Jane Li-Su
The Crazy Companies II (1988) – Niko
The Last Duel (1989) – Pok Mei-Li / Chi Hau
Proud and Confident (1989) – Jennifer Tang
Ghost Fever (1989) – Pinkey
I Am Sorry (1989) – Alice
Casino Raiders (1989) – Bo Bo
What a Small World (1989) – Michelle
Mr. Smart (1989) – Mona Fong
Brief Encounter in Shinjuku (1990) – Wendy Wan
Return to Action (1990) – Joey Chan
Tiger Cage 2 (1990) – Mandy Chang
A Bite of Love (1990) – Anna
Undeclared War (1990) – Ann Chang
Tricky Brains (1991) – Lucy Ching
This Thing Called Love (1991) – Janice
Once Upon a Time in China (1991) – 13th Aunt
Inspector Pink Dragon (1991) – Julia
The Banquet (1991) – Gigi
Pretty Ghost (1991) – Chia – The Ghost
Gigolo and Whore II (1992) – Sherin Chan
Swordsman II (a.k.a. The Legend of the Swordsman) (1992) – Yam Ying Ying
Once Upon a Time in China II (1992) – 13th Aunt
With or Without You  (1992) – Tweedy
Gameboy Kids (1992) – Kwan, Chi-Lam
Saviour of the Soul 2 (1992) – The Ice Woman
The Sting (1992) – Yvonne
Once Upon a Time in China III (1992) – 13th Aunt
All's Well, Ends Well Too (1993) – Snow White
No More Love, No More Death (1993) – Tracy Chan
Love Among the Triad (1993) – Kwok Hoi-Lam
Blade of Fury (1993) – Noblewoman
The Magic Crane (1993) – Butterfly Lam
End of the Road (1993) – Chei's wife
Assassin (1993) – Yiu
Love is a Fairy Tale (1993) – Michelle
The Great Conqueror's Concubine (1994) – Yu Ji
Long and Winding Road (1994) – Winnie Tsang
Once Upon a Time in China V (1994) – 13th Aunt
The Eight Hilarious Gods (1994) – Ho Sin-gu
A Touch of Evil (1995) – Coco Xu Liuxin
The Adventurers (1995) – Mona
Dr. Wai in "The Scripture with No Words" (1996) – Monica Kwan / Cammy
Thanks for Your Love (1/2 ) (1996) – Li Lam-Lam
Once Upon a Time in China and America (a.k.a. Once Upon a Time in China and America) (1997) – 13th Aunt
Big Shot's Funeral (2001) – Lucy
The Wesley's Mysterious File (a.k.a. The Wesley's Mysterious Story) (2001) – Fong Tin Ai
Mighty Baby (2002) – Sabrina
Hands in the Hair (2006) – Aini (final film role)

Award and nomination

References

External links 
 
 HK cinemagic entry

Hong Kong film actresses
1962 births
Living people
Hong Kong people of Manchu descent
Manchu actresses
Manchu singers
20th-century Hong Kong actresses
21st-century Hong Kong actresses